Misheh Deh may refer to:
 Misheh Deh-e Olya
 Misheh Deh-e Sofla